John Strong was an English mariner.

During an expedition from London to South America in 1689–91, commanding HMS Welfare, he discovered the sound between the two main islands in the Falkland Islands. He named it Falkland Sound for Anthony Cary, 5th Viscount of Falkland, a part-owner in the Welfare. Anthony partly sponsored his journey. Later, the name Falkland was adopted to the entire archipelago.

On 27 January 1690, he made the first recorded landing in the Falkland Islands. The expedition continued through the Strait of Magellan. His expedition also recorded the first 
sighting of the Falkland Islands wolf

John Strong left a legacy that continued into the 1700s. In 1765, the English founded their first permanent colony, Port Egmont

References

17th-century English people
English explorers
Year of death missing